Blandt Syd-Amerikas urskovsindianere (Among the Primeval Forest Indians of South America) is a Swedish–Norwegian documentary film about Gustaf Bolinder's ethnographic expedition to South America from 1920 to 1921. The film was shot by Ottar Gladtvet, who took part in the expedition, by agreement between Bolinder and the film's producer, Gustav Lund.

The film documents the expedition, whose purpose was to record the endangered Wayuu, Arhuaco, and Barí native cultures in Colombia and Venezuela.

Notes

References

External links

Blandt Syd-Amerikas urskovsindianere at the National Library of Norway
Blandt Syd-Amerikas urskovsindianere at Filmfront

1921 films
Norwegian silent films
Swedish silent films
Norwegian black-and-white films
Swedish black-and-white films
Norwegian documentary films
Swedish documentary films
1920s Swedish films